In Myanmar culture, glass mosaic is a traditional form of glasswork where pieces of glass are used to embellish decorative art, structures, and furniture. Glass mosaic is typically divided into two subcategories, hman gyan si and hman nu si. The former is typically used to decorate the walls and ceilings of pagodas, while the latter is used to embellish furniture and accessories. The art form originated in the 1500s during the Nyaungyan era. Glass mosaic is often studded with gems and semi-precious stones.

History
Glass mosaic is a traditional Burmese mosaic made with pieces of glass, used to embellish decorative art, structures, and furniture. Glass mosaic is typically divided into two subcategories, hman gyan si and hman nu si. The former is typically used to decorate the walls and ceilings of pagodas, while the latter is used to embellish furniture and accessories. The art form originated in the 1500s during the Nyaungyan era. Glass mosaic is often studded with gems and semi-precious stones.

The National Museum of Myanmar exhibits hundreds of glass mosaic pieces like dolls, animal figures, chairs.

Notable artists
 Isaiah Zagar
 Boris Anrep
 Miksa Róth

Materials
Glass
Gems
Glue
Grout
Sponge

See also

 Mosaic
 Art of Myanmar
 Tiffany Glass and Decorating Company

References

External links
Glass Mosaics of Burma, 1901

Burmese art
Mosaic
Architectural elements
Glass art